Eugene Levy   (born December 17, 1946) is a Canadian actor and comedian. Known for portraying flustered and unconventional figures, Levy has won multiple accolades throughout his career including four Primetime Emmy Awards, a Grammy Award, and a Screen Actors Guild Award. He was appointed to the Order of Canada in 2011, and was made Companion of the Order of Canada in 2022.

Levy started his career writing and acting in the Canadian television sketch series SCTV (1976–1984), earning two Primetime Emmy Awards for Outstanding Writing for a Variety Series. He also appeared in the films National Lampoon's Vacation (1983), Splash (1984), and Multiplicity (1996). He also became known for co-writing and appearances in a string of films with Christopher Guest, including Waiting for Guffman (1996), Best in Show (2000), A Mighty Wind (2003), and For Your Consideration (2006). He also appeared in the American Pie series of films.

From 2015 to 2020, he starred as Johnny Rose in the sitcom Schitt's Creek, a comedy series that he co-created with his son and co-star Dan Levy. In 2019 and 2020, he was nominated for the Primetime Emmy Award for Outstanding Lead Actor in a Comedy Series, which he won in 2020. He also received the Screen Actors Guild Award for Outstanding Performance by an Ensemble in a Comedy Series.

Early life
Levy was born to a Jewish family in downtown Hamilton, Ontario. His mother, Rebecca (Kudlatz), was a homemaker, and his father  was a foreman at an automobile plant. He has a brother, Fred, and sister, Barbara. His mother was born in Glasgow, Scotland, to Polish Jewish parents, later moving to Canada. His father was Sephardi Jewish, with ancestors from Spain and Bulgaria.

Levy attended Westdale Secondary School, where he was student council president. He subsequently attended McMaster University. He was vice-president of the McMaster Film Board, a student film group, where he met filmmaker Ivan Reitman.

Career

The 1972–1973 Toronto production of the hit musical Godspell opened at the Royal Alexandra Theatre and was intended to be a run of a few dozen performances for a subscription audience. The cast was drawn entirely from local performers, instead of a touring cast. The Toronto production launched the careers of many actors, including Levy, Victor Garber, Andrea Martin, Gilda Radner, Dave Thomas, and Martin Short, as well as the show's musical director, Paul Shaffer. Howard Shore played saxophone for this production. After an enthusiastic response from the audience, the scheduled run at the Royal Alexandra ended and the show moved uptown to the Bayview Playhouse in Leaside. The Bayview Playhouse production ran until August 1973, with a then-record run of 488 performances.

An alumnus of both the Second City, Toronto and the sketch comedy series Second City Television, Levy often plays unusual supporting characters with nerdy streaks. Perhaps his best-known role on SCTV is the dimwitted Earl Camembert, a news anchor for the "SCTV News" and a parody of real-life Canadian newsman Earl Cameron. Celebrities impersonated by Levy on SCTV include Perry Como, Ricardo Montalbán, Alex Trebek, Sean Connery, Howard Cosell, Henry Kissinger, Menachem Begin, Bud Abbott, Milton Berle, John Charles Daly, Gene Shalit, Judd Hirsch, Jack Carter, Muammar al-Gaddafi, Tony Dow, James Caan, Lorne Greene, Rex Reed, Ralph Young (of Sandler and Young), F. Lee Bailey, Ernest Borgnine, former Ontario chief coroner and talk show host Dr. Morton Shulman, Norman Mailer, Neil Sedaka and Howard McNear as Floyd the Barber.

Original Levy characterizations on SCTV are news reporter Earl Camembert, comic Bobby Bittman, scandal sheet entrepreneur Dr. Raoul Withers, "report on business" naïf Brian Johns, 3-D horror auteur Woody Tobias Jr., cheerful Leutonian accordionist Stan Schmenge, lecherous dream interpreter Raoul Wilson, hammer-voiced sports broadcaster Lou Jaffe, diminutive union patriarch Sid Dithers ("San Francisckie! Did you drove or did you flew?"), fey current-events commentator Joel Weiss, buttoned-down panel show moderator Dougal Currie, smarmy Just for Fun emcee Stan Kanter, energetic used car salesman Al Peck, guileless security guard Gus Gustofferson, Phil the Garment King (also of Phil's Nails), and the inept teen dance show host Rockin' Mel Slirrup.

Though he has been the "above the title" star in only two films, Armed and Dangerous (1986) and The Man (2005), he has featured prominently in many films. He is the co-writer and frequent cast member of Christopher Guest's mockumentary features, particularly A Mighty Wind, where his sympathetic performance as emotionally unstable folksinger Mitch Cohen won kudos; his accolades included a Satellite Award for Best Supporting Actor – Musical or Comedy and the prestigious New York Film Critics Circle Award for Best Supporting Actor. In the 1980s and 1990s, he appeared in Splash, National Lampoon's Vacation, Club Paradise, Stay Tuned, Multiplicity, Serendipity and other comedies. Levy was the creator of Maniac Mansion, a television sitcom based on the LucasArts video game of the same name. He was also seriously considered for the role of Toby Ziegler on The West Wing, a role that went to actor Richard Schiff.

Levy, along with his son Dan Levy, is co-creator of the CBC/Pop TV sitcom Schitt's Creek. He also stars in the show alongside his son as head of the Rose family, Johnny Rose. His daughter, Sarah Levy, portrays Twyla Sands, the waitress at the Schitt's Creek diner. Eugene Levy's brother Fred is also a producer on the show.

On December 13, 2022, it was announced that Levy would be host and executive producer for an Apple Original eight-episode travel series titled The Reluctant Traveler, premiering February 23, 2023, on Apple TV+.

Personal life
Levy married Deborah Divine in 1977. Divine's career has been in TV production. The couple have two children whom they raised in Toronto: actors Dan and Sarah, both of whom starred alongside their father on Schitt's Creek.

Levy is an advocate for autism awareness and treatment. He was a close friend of actor John Candy. Levy is a member of the Canadian charity Artists Against Racism.

In 2021, he was named honorary mayor of Pacific Palisades.

Filmography

Film

Television

Other

Awards and nominations

Levy, along with Christopher Guest and Michael McKean, was awarded the 2003 Grammy Award for Best Song Written for a Motion Picture, Television or Other Visual Media for the title song from A Mighty Wind. Levy received the Governor General's Performing Arts Award, Canada's highest honour in the performing arts, in 2008.

In March 2006, it was announced that he would receive a star on Canada's Walk of Fame. In 2002, the entire cast of SCTV was given a group star, and although Levy is not mentioned on the actual star, he was still inducted as a part of the group. This makes him one of only four two-time honourees, alongside fellow SCTV alumni John Candy, Martin Short, and Catherine O'Hara. Levy is one of only a handful of people who have won at least five Canadian Comedy Awards, including two for Best Writing (Best in Show in 2001 and A Mighty Wind in 2004) and three for Best Male Performer (Best in Show, American Pie 2 in 2002, and A Mighty Wind).

In 2008, the Governor General of Canada presented Levy with the Governor General's Performing Arts Awards (GGPAA), a lifetime achievement award considered "for their outstanding body of work and enduring contribution to the performing arts in Canada.". In 2010, Levy was awarded the ACTRA Award by the union representing Canada's actors. In 2011, Levy was made a Member of the Order of Canada "for his contributions as a comic actor and writer, and for his dedication to charitable causes" and promoted to the rank of Companion in 2022.

On May 22, 2012, Levy delivered a commencement address at Dalhousie University, in Halifax, Nova Scotia, and was awarded the degree Doctor of Laws (honoris causa). On June 11, 2012, Levy was presented with the Queen Elizabeth II Diamond Jubilee Medal by the Lieutenant Governor of Ontario.

On March 13, 2016, Levy took home the award for "Best Performance by an Actor in a Continuing Leading Comedic Role" at the 4th Annual Canadian Screen Awards, for his performance as Johnny Rose in the CBC/Pop TV sitcom Schitt's Creek.

References

External links

 
 
 Article at thecanadianencyclopedia.ca
 

1946 births
Living people
20th-century Canadian comedians
20th-century Canadian male actors
21st-century Canadian comedians
21st-century Canadian male actors
Autism activists
Best Actor in a Comedy Series Canadian Screen Award winners
Canadian Ashkenazi Jews
Canadian Comedy Award winners
Canadian emigrants to the United States
Canadian expatriate male actors in the United States
Film producers from Ontario
Canadian impressionists (entertainers)
Canadian male comedians
Canadian male film actors
Canadian male television actors
Canadian male voice actors
Canadian people of Bulgarian-Jewish descent
Canadian people of Polish-Jewish descent
Canadian people of Scottish-Jewish descent
Canadian sketch comedians
Canadian songwriters
Canadian television directors
Canadian television personalities
Canadian television producers
Comedians from Toronto
Companions of the Order of Canada
Governor General's Performing Arts Award winners
Grammy Award winners
Jewish Canadian comedians
Jewish Canadian filmmakers
Jewish Canadian male actors
Jewish Canadian writers
Jewish male comedians
Male actors from Hamilton, Ontario
Male actors from Los Angeles
Male actors from Toronto
McMaster University alumni
Outstanding Performance by a Lead Actor in a Comedy Series Primetime Emmy Award winners
Writers from Hamilton, Ontario
Writers from Los Angeles
Writers from Toronto